The Huron River is a  river in southeastern Michigan, rising out of the Huron Swamp in Springfield Township in northern Oakland County and flowing into Lake Erie, as it forms the boundary between present-day Wayne and Monroe counties. Thirteen parks, game areas, and recreation areas are associated with the river, which passes through the cities of Dexter, Ann Arbor, Ypsilanti, Belleville, Flat Rock and Rockwood that were developed along its banks.

The Huron River is a typical Southeast Michigan stream; mud banks, slow stream flow and a low gradient define this river. It runs through the following counties, in order from the headwaters to its mouth: Oakland, Livingston, Washtenaw, Wayne, and Monroe. The Huron River watershed drains . It is the only state-designated Country-Scenic Natural River in southeast Michigan. This includes  of the mainstream, plus an additional  of three tributaries.

The river was named after the Huron band of Native Americans who lived in the area. In Native languages, it was called cos-scut-e-nong sebee or Giwitatigweiasibi. It was part of a Native American trade route.

The river has many dams, 19 on the main stream and at least 96 in the entire system.  Most dams are only a few feet high, built to slightly increase and maintain water levels in existing lakes to provide drought protection and flood control, a use that is now environmentally controversial.  However, at least a dozen dams were built for mill or hydroelectric power and several formed large new lakes behind them.  Some of these on the Huron River mainstream are Kent Lake, Barton Pond, Argo Pond, Ford Lake, Belleville Lake, and Flat Rock Pond.

The Huron River flows through numerous parks and is a prime canoeing river with a generally slow current and only a few minor rapids or obstructions, except for the short Delhi rapids which is runnable by experienced canoeists and kayakers except during low water.

The river is heavily fished by sportsmen for rock bass, sunfish, bluegill, black crappie, white bass, smallmouth bass, largemouth bass, northern pike, walleye, catfish, trout, muskie, and below Belleville Dam, Coho salmon, Chinook salmon, and Steelhead. Suckers and carp are also common fish in the river.

In 2009, faculty and students from the University of Michigan produced "Mapping the River," a multimedia presentation combining dance, poetry, music, and projected images which explored the role of the Huron in communities along it.

History
The Huron River was declared navigable by Congress in the 19th century, and for a time, there was flat-boat traffic from Ypsilanti to Lake Erie.  This was discontinued as the railroads penetrated the region and milling developed along the river.  By the 1880s, the Huron River was considered peculiar among the rivers in the region because it was intensely exploited for water-powered manufacturing.  The census reported a total of 17 developed mill dams on the river, many providing power to multiple mills.  Flour milling dominated, but there were also sawmills and woolen mills.
As the 20th century began, the Detroit Edison Company and Ford Motor Company began acquiring and developing dams along the river for electric power.

Floods
Notable floods have occurred in 1904, 1918, 1968 and 1982.

Tributaries

Significant tributaries of the Huron River are listed below, in order of progression upstream.  Sub-tributaries are indented below their parent watercourse.
Smith Creek
Silver Creek
Port Creek
Willow Run
Fleming Creek
Swift Run
Malletts Creek
Traver Creek
Allen Creek
Boyden Creek
Honey Creek
Millers Creek
Mill Creek
Portage River and Portage Creek
Livermore Creek
Arms Creek
Honey Creek
Hay Creek
Chilson Creek
Horseshoe Lake Creek
South Ore Creek
Davis Creek
Woodruff Creek
Mann Creek
Pettibone Creek
Norton Creek

Path
The river flows through the following parks and cities in this order starting from the headwaters:

 Indian Springs Metropark
 Pontiac Lake Recreation Area
 Proud Lake State Recreation Area
 Milford
 Camp Dearborn
 Kensington Metropark
 Island Lake Recreation Area
 Huron Meadows Metropark
 Hudson Mills Metropark
 Dexter
 Dexter–Huron Metropark
 Delhi Metropark
 Ann Arbor
 Nichols Arboretum
 Ypsilanti
 Lower Huron Metropark
 Willow Metropark
 Oakwoods Metropark
 Lake Erie Metropark
 Pointe Mouillee State Game Area

Major dams

Historical name confusion with Clinton River
The Clinton River was also known as the Huron River until 1824. It was renamed in 1824 by the Michigan Territorial Council to avoid confusion between the two rivers.

See also
Huron river chain of lakes

References

External links

Huron River Watershed Council
History of Peninsular Dam

USGS river level data, at Ann Arbor

Rivers of Michigan
Tributaries of Lake Erie
Rivers of Monroe County, Michigan
Rivers of Oakland County, Michigan
Rivers of Livingston County, Michigan
Rivers of Washtenaw County, Michigan
Rivers of Wayne County, Michigan